Two Cultural Heritages are listed as in Need of Urgent Safeguarding. These are Naqqali and "Traditional skills of building and sailing Iranian Lenj boats".

References

Iranian culture
Azerbaijani culture
 Iran